Sardara Singh (born 15 July 1986), sometimes referred as Sardar Singh, is an Indian former professional field hockey player and captain of the Indian national team. He usually plays the center half position. Sardara became the youngest player to captain the Indian team when he led the side at the 2008 Sultan Azlan Shah Cup. He was awarded Padma Shri, the fourth highest civilian award of India, in 2015. 
On 13 July 2016, the responsibilities of the captain were handed over from him to P. R. Sreejesh, the goalkeeper of Indian Team. On 12 September 2018, Sardara announced his retirement from international hockey. He played 314 matches during 12 years in his career.

Early life
Sardara was born in Haryana's village Sant Nagar in Sirsa District to Gurnam Singh, a RMP doctor, and Jasveer Kaur, a housewife.

Career
Sardara Singh made his debut for India in the junior team during India's 2003–04 tour of Poland. He made his senior debut against Pakistan in 2006. He also plays for his state of Haryana. He is a Deputy Superintendent Police Officer with the Haryana Police and plays for their team. Singh played for Chandigarh Dynamos in the inaugural season of the Premier Hockey League in 2005. He played for Hyderabad Sultans in the next three seasons till 2008, captaining the side.

His brother Didar Singh, a drag flick specialist also played for the Indian team, Haryana and Chandigarh Dynamos.

In 2010, he was included in the 18-men FIH All-Star team. In the same year, Singh was signed by the Belgian club, KHC Leuven to play in the Belgian Hockey League. In 2011, he was again named on the FIH All-Star team. Following Singh's impressive showing at the 2013 Asia Cup, he was signed by the Dutch club HC Bloemendaal as a replacement to Teun de Nooijer.

On 13 July 2016, the responsibilities of the captain were handed over from him to P. R. Sreejesh, the goalkeeper of Indian team. He has captained Indian team for 8 years.

He quit the sport in September 2018. In 2019, he was included in a 13-member Hockey India selection committee.

Hockey India League
Sardar Singh became the highest-paid marquee player at the inaugural Hockey India League auctions as the Delhi franchise bought him for US$78,000 (42,49,000). The Delhi team was named Delhi Waveriders. He captained his side to finish on second place in its inaugural season and was awarded the 'Player of the Tournament.' He was honoured with Rajiv Gandhi Khel Ratna Award.

Punjabi Music Industry
Sardar Singh is making his first Punjabi Music Industry debut by featuring in song ‘Gallan Karraiyan’ by veteran Punjabi singer Hardeep Singh of Shehar Patiale de fame. The song is written by Sukha Wadali and the music is by Jaidev Kumar.

Achievements
 Awarded 'Player of Tournament' in the 2012 Sultan Azlan Shah Cup, where India won the Bronze.
 He was adjudged the Player of the Tournament in the 2012 Summer Olympics Qualifiers, where India won the Gold.
 He was adjudged the Player of the Tournament in the 2010 Sultan Azlan Shah Cup, where India won the Gold.
 He participated in Sultan Azlan Shah Hockey Tournament in Malaysia in the year 2006 and the team won Bronze Medal.
 He participated in SAF Games at Colombo in the year 2006 and the team scored 2nd position.
 He participated in 7th Junior Challenge Open Men's at Poland 2006 and scored 2nd position.
 He participated in 2007 Men's Hockey Champions Challenge at Belgium 2007 and got Bronze Medal.
 He participated in Commonwealth Games 2006 at Melbourne.
 He participated in INDO-PAK series 2006.
 He participated in Four Nations International Tournament at Germany and the team scored Bronze Medal.
 He also participated in Four Nations Hockey Tournament at Lahore and the team win Silver Medal.
 He participated in Men's Hockey Asia Cup at Chennai 2007 and the team grabbed Gold Medal.
He participated for India in Canada for the 7 game Test Series against the Canadian National Field Hockey Team

References

External links
 Profile at Hockey India
 
 

1986 births
Living people
People from Sirsa district
Field hockey players from Haryana
Field hockey players at the 2006 Commonwealth Games
Field hockey players at the 2010 Commonwealth Games
Field hockey players at the 2014 Commonwealth Games
Asian Games medalists in field hockey
Field hockey players at the 2012 Summer Olympics
Field hockey players at the 2016 Summer Olympics
Olympic field hockey players of India
Recipients of the Arjuna Award
Field hockey players at the 2010 Asian Games
Field hockey players at the 2014 Asian Games
Field hockey players at the 2018 Asian Games
Indian male field hockey players
Asian Games gold medalists for India
Asian Games bronze medalists for India
Commonwealth Games silver medallists for India
Commonwealth Games medallists in field hockey
Recipients of the Padma Shri in sports
Medalists at the 2010 Asian Games
Medalists at the 2014 Asian Games
Medalists at the 2018 Asian Games
Recipients of the Khel Ratna Award
Expatriate field hockey players
Indian expatriates in the Netherlands
Male field hockey defenders
Delhi Waveriders players
HC Bloemendaal players
Hockey India League players
KHC Leuven players
Men's Belgian Hockey League players
Men's Hoofdklasse Hockey players
2010 Men's Hockey World Cup players
2014 Men's Hockey World Cup players
Medallists at the 2010 Commonwealth Games
Indian field hockey coaches